Dulla Bhatti is a 2016 Indian Punjabi-language film directed by Minar Malhotra and starring Binnu Dhillon, Aman Hundal, Sardar Sohi, B.N. Sharma, Amar Noorie, Dev Kharoud, Nirmal Rishi, and Malkit Rauni. Casting of the movie is by Kamz Kreationz and Shaifali Srivastav. Movie is inspired by the story of Dulla Bhatti.

Cast
Binnu Dhillon as Dara
Aman Hundal
Sardar Sohi
B.N Sharma
Dev Kharoud
Amar Noorie
Malkit Rauni
Nirmal Rishi
Amitansh
Naman Gupta
Mani Dhaliwal
Anmol Verma

References

External links 
 

2016 films
Films based on Indian folklore
Punjabi-language Indian films
2010s Punjabi-language films
Films scored by Laddi Gill